Roger Powell Jr. (born January 15, 1983) is an American former professional basketball player and assistant coach for the Gonzaga Bulldogs men's basketball team. He played collegiately at the University of Illinois from 2001–2005, after having attended Joliet West High School, with a 2001 graduation. Powell played the forward position for his high school and in college. He graduated from the University of Illinois with a degree in speech communications. Powell's father was a former Joliet Central High School and Illinois State player.

Biography

High school career
Powell was a three-year starter and a four-year letter winner for Joliet Township High School. As a junior, he led the Steelmen to a 20-8 record averaging 19 points and eight rebounds. Powell helped his squad win the SICA West Conference as a junior and senior. Also as a junior, he earned a bronze medal as a member of the 1999 USA Basketball Men's Youth Development Festival North Team. Powell also made the Pontiac Holiday Tourney all-Tournament Team and was second team all state.

As a senior, Powell averaged 20.7 points and nine rebounds for a 25-5 sectional finalist that was ranked No. 3 in the Chicago area. He earned First Team All State honors at Joliet in 2001 from the Chicago Tribune, Chicago Sun-Times, Champaign-Urbana News-Gazette, Associated Press and Illinois Basketball Coaches Association. He was considered a consensus Top 100 prospect in the nation and was fourth in voting for Mr. Basketball in Illinois. He played in the Wendy's All-Star Classic and earned MVP honors at the IBCA All-Star Game following his senior year.

Early college career
As a true freshman, Powell played in 27 games and averaged 2.9 points and 1.8 rebounds per game. In his first year, he scored a season high 12 points against Western Illinois. He played a season high 15 minutes against Loyola-Chicago where he scored five points and added five rebounds. His role was primarily to provide a spark off the bench which he did against Wisconsin, scoring six points on 3 of 3 shooting and grabbing four rebounds, three offensive. In the NCAA tournament, he provided four points and four rebounds in seven minutes of play in Illinois' first round win against San Diego State University.

In his sophomore season, Powell started 19 games including 10 of the last 11. He led the Big Ten in field goal percentage in conference games with a 64.1 percent mark. He was third on the team in scoring with 8.7 points per game. He scored a season high 22 points vs. Indiana on 9 of 13 shooting. He scored in double figures 13 times and scoring 15+ points 9 times. He was slowed by a toe injury mid-season causing him to be out of the lineup for two weeks. He was named to the Big Ten All-Tournament Team leading Illinois with 16 points in the title game vs. Ohio State. He participated on the Big Ten European Tour team and led the squad in scoring 14 points per game.

Late college career
In his third season with the Illini, Powell was an honorable mention All-Big Ten selection. Powell started 31 games on the season missing some time due to a concussion suffered in a Big Ten tournament quarterfinal game against Indiana. He averaged 11.6 points per game, putting him third on the team and 20th in the Big Ten. He also averaged 5 rebounds a game which was second on the team. He ranked third in the Big Ten in field goal shooting at 59.5 percent. He was also second on the team in offensive rebounding notching 75 on the season. Powell scored a career- high 24 points and grabbed nine rebounds at Wisconsin on January 24, 2004. In the NCAA tournament, he scored 22 points on 9-11 shooting in the NCAA Tournament second- round win over Cincinnati and followed that performance with a team-high 15-point, eight-rebound game in a Sweet 16 loss to Duke. Powell entered the NBA draft but did not sign with an agent and was not drafted allowing him to return for his senior season.

In his final season, Powell was named an honorable mention All-Big Ten selection by both league coaches and media. He was a member of the national runner-up Illini who tied an NCAA record with 37 wins. He started every game and ranked fourth on the team in scoring, averaging 12.0 points per game, and scoring in double figures in 26 of 39 games. He was second on the Illini and eleventh in the Big Ten averaging 5.7 rebounds per game. He was named Big Ten player of the week on December 6 following wins over Wake Forest (19 points) and Arkansas (19 points, 11 rebounds).

He scored his 1,000th point vs. Indiana on Feb. 6 and ended his career ranked 26th on the Illini all-time scoring list with 1,178 career points. He also ranks fifth in school history in career field goal percentage at 57.2 percent (456-797).

Career college statistics

G-GS = Games Played and Games Started
Min-Avg = Minutes per season and average minutes per game
FGM-A/% = Field Goals Made per Attempts and Percentage
3PM-A/% = Three Point Field Goals Made per Attempts and Percentage  
FTM-A/% = Free Throws Made per Attempts and Percentage
OR-DR—TOT/Avg = Offensive Rebounds, Defensive Rebounds, Total Rebounds, and Average per game
PF-DQ = Personal Fouls and Disqualifications
A = Assists
TO = Turnovers
B = Blocks
S = Steals
PTS/Avg = Total Points and Average Points per Game

Professional career
Powell participated in various NBA summer leagues looking to be picked up by an NBA roster. He eventually made the Seattle SuperSonics' training roster but failed to make the final roster.

Powell then decided to play in the Continental Basketball Association (CBA). The Rockford Lightning drafted Powell in the fourth round (30th overall selection) of the CBA draft in 2005. He enjoyed unparalleled success with the Lightning. The CBA named Powell the Rookie of the Year for the 2005-06 season, voted on by the eight CBA head coaches. He was nominated to the All-CBA Second Team and All-Rookie Team.

Powell continued to pursue a career in the NBA trying out for the Utah Jazz where he was reunited with former Illini teammates Dee Brown and Deron Williams. After working relentlessly over the summer, Powell made the Jazz's final roster for the 2006-07 NBA season. However, he was cut in mid-January, having scored his first points in the NBA with a pair of free throws on November 18, 2006 against the Phoenix Suns after being fouled by Shawn Marion.

He then played for the Arkansas Rimrockers of the NBDL. Powell was named the D-League's player of the month for February 2007, averaging 27.6 points and 7.3 rebounds in 11 games, scoring at least 19 in each of the 11, including 46 in a February 2 game against the Fort Worth Flyers. In April 2007, he received the NBA Development League 2006-2007 Jason Collier Sportsmanship Award for Conduct and Character on court.

In 2007-08, he joined Teramo Basket of Serie A in Italy.

In October 2008, he joined the Chicago Bulls but did not make the final roster.

In 2008-09, he joined Hapoel Jerusalem of the Israeli League.

In 2009-10, he joined CB Murcia of Spain's Liga ACB, the top division of Spain's professional leagues.

In February 2010 he signed a three-month contract with JDA Dijon in France.

He spent the 2010 preseason on the Chicago Bulls' training camp roster. However, he was waived on October 21.

On October 28, 2010 he signed a contract with the German club Skyliners Frankfurt until mid-January, with an extension option until the end of the season.

Coaching career
On June 28, 2011 Powell joined the coaching staff of Valparaiso Crusaders men's basketball, as an assistant.

On April 6, 2016 Powell followed Bryce Drew to Vanderbilt and joined the coaching staff of Vanderbilt Commodores men's basketball, as an Associate Head Coach.

References

External links
Vanderbilt Profile
Valparaiso Profile
Player profile @ NBA.com
Profile at FightingIllini.com

Roger Powell, Jr.'s official ministry website

1983 births
Living people
African-American basketball players
American expatriate basketball people in France
American expatriate basketball people in Germany
American expatriate basketball people in Israel
American expatriate basketball people in Italy
American expatriate basketball people in Spain
American men's basketball players
Arkansas RimRockers players
Basketball players from Illinois
CB Murcia players
Gonzaga Bulldogs men's basketball coaches
Hapoel Jerusalem B.C. players
Illinois Fighting Illini men's basketball players
Israeli Basketball Premier League players
JDA Dijon Basket players
Liga ACB players
Rockford Lightning players
Skyliners Frankfurt players
Small forwards
Sportspeople from Joliet, Illinois
Teramo Basket players
Undrafted National Basketball Association players
Utah Jazz players
Valparaiso Beacons men's basketball coaches
Vanderbilt Commodores men's basketball coaches